Marwa may refer to:

Places
 Al-Safa and Al-Marwah, hills in Saudi Arabia
 Marwah, a subdivision of Kishtwar district, Jammu and Kashmir, India
 Marwa Thermal Power Plant, power station near Marwa village in Janjgir–Champa district, Chhattisgarh, India

People
 Marwa (name), Arabic feminine given name, or Kuria masculine given name; also a surname

Arts and entertainment
Marwas or Minwas, a small double-sided hand drum originally from the Middle East
"Marwa Blues", an instrumental by English musician George Harrison
Marwa and al-Majnun al-Faransi, a classical Middle Eastern love story

See also
 Marva (disambiguation)
 Marfa (disambiguation)
 Marwah (disambiguation)